Gastón Etlis and Martín Rodríguez were the defending champions but lost in the first round to Agustín Calleri and Mariano Hood.

Calleri and Hood won in the final 6–3, 1–6, 6–4 against František Čermák and Leoš Friedl.

Seeds

  Gastón Etlis /  Martín Rodríguez (first round)
  František Čermák /  Leoš Friedl (final)
  Simon Aspelin /  Andrew Kratzmann (first round)
  Lucas Arnold /  Luis Lobo (first round)

Draw

References
 2003 BellSouth Open Doubles Draw

Chile Open (tennis)
2003 ATP Tour